Mountain Air Cargo (MAC) is an American cargo airline based in Denver, North Carolina. It is a major contract carrier for FedEx Express, operating in the eastern United States and the Caribbean region. Previous turboprop operations in South America have been discontinued by FedEx, which now operates jet aircraft in that area. MAC is one of the largest feeder airlines in the United States. Its main maintenance facility is at Kinston Regional Jetport.  All of the ATR and C208 aircraft operated by Mountain Air are owned by FedEx Express, and are operated by MAC on a "dry lease" basis.

History 

The airline was established in 1974 and is wholly owned by Air T, Inc. It has 270 employees (as of November 2015).

Incidents and accidents 

 October 11, 1985 - a de Havilland Canada DHC-6-200 Twin Otter registered N3257, on a flight from State College to Pittsburgh in Pennsylvania, collided with rising terrain near Homer City, Pennsylvania. The pilot, who was the only occupant, was killed.
 January 19, 1988 - a de Havilland Canada DHC-6-200 Twin Otter registered N996SA, on a flight from Erie, Pennsylvania, to Charlotte, North Carolina, descended below the glide path on approach to Charlotte/Douglas International Airport, collided with a tree and struck the ground 1.6 km away from the airport. The crash was caused by pilot error. The pilot, who was the only occupant, was severely injured.
 January 9, 1998 - a Cessna 208B Super Cargomaster, on take off from Maiden-Little Mountain Airport in Maiden, North Carolina, on a flight to Greensboro, North Carolina, veered off the runway and hit trees. The crash was determined to be due to the control gust lock still being in place during the takeoff. The pilot, who was the only occupant, was killed.
 March 8, 2003 - a Fokker F27-500 Friendship with the registration N712FE, en route from Greensboro, North Carolina, to New Bern, North Carolina, indicated an unsafe landing gear condition during the approach to New Bern. A tower flyby was performed, and the tower controller confirmed the right gear was not fully extended. The crew declared an emergency and diverted to Kinston Regional Jetport to conduct an emergency landing. On the landing roll the right main landing gear collapsed and the airplane slid off the runway. Examination of the right main landing gear revealed the drag brace was fractured. The aircraft was retired from service. There were no casualties.
 April 27, 2004 - Fokker F27-500 registration N715FE departed Buenos Aires, Argentina, for a cargo flight to São Paulo-Viracopos, Brazil, via Porto Alegre. En route on the first leg, a crew member noticed the presence of smoke and discovered a fire in the cargo bay. Efforts to extinguish the fire were unsuccessful. The crew effected a safe emergency landing at Melo, Uruguay. The airplane suffered considerable damage in the cargo compartment. There were no casualties. The fire was caused by improperly packaged and labeled hazardous materials.

Fleet 

As of September 2016 the Mountain Air Cargo fleet includes:

8 ATR 42-300
2 ATR 42-320
3 ATR 72-202
6 ATR 72-212
33 Cessna 208B Super Cargomaster

References

External links 
 
 Air T

Airlines based in North Carolina
Airlines established in 1974
Transportation in Lincoln County, North Carolina
Cargo airlines of the United States